Liu Xiwu (July 12, 1904 – February 28, 1970) was a People's Republic of China politician. He was born in Meng County, Henan Province (modern Mengzhou, Jiaozuo, Henan Province) and educated in Kaifeng. In August 1924 he joined the Communist Youth League of China and in 1926 he became a member of the Communist Party of China. While studying at Shanghai University, he joined the League of Left-Wing Writers in 1930. In 1936, he left Shanghai for Yan'an, Shaanxi Province. After the founding of the People's Republic, he became the 1st Communist Party Committee Secretary of Jilin Province.

1904 births
1970 deaths
People's Republic of China politicians from Henan
Chinese Communist Party politicians from Henan
Political office-holders in Jilin
Members of the 2nd Chinese People's Political Consultative Conference
61 Renegades
Political commissars of the Jilin Military District